Richard Kruger is an American business executive. He is the former chief executive officer, chairman, and president of Imperial Oil, serving from 2013 to 2019. Previously, he served as President of Production and Vice President of Operations for ExxonMobil, having been employed by the company since 1981. Raised in Richfield, Minnesota, a 1977 Richfield High School graduate, he holds a mechanical engineering degree from the University of Minnesota, and a business administration degree from the University of Houston. 

On February 21, 2023, Suncor Energy Inc. announced that Kruger had been named its new chief executive officer after a months-long search. Kruger will replace interim Suncor CEO Kris Smith on April 3, 2023.

References

American chief executives
Living people
Date of birth missing (living people)
ExxonMobil people
University of Minnesota College of Science and Engineering alumni
University of Houston alumni
People from Richfield, Minnesota
Year of birth missing (living people)